Michel Ternest (born 6 August 1991) is a Belgian footballer who plays as a forward for Belgian Fourth Provincial club Jong Zulte.

References

External links
Guardian Football

1991 births
Living people
Belgian footballers
K.S.V. Roeselare players
KFC Turnhout players
Belgian Pro League players
Challenger Pro League players
Association football forwards